The alveolar nasal click is a click consonant found primarily among the languages of southern Africa.

Features
Features of the alveolar nasal click:

Occurrence
Alveolar nasal clicks are found primarily in the various Khoisan language families of southern Africa and in some neighboring Bantu languages such as Yeyi.

Glottalized alveolar nasal click

All Khoisan languages, and a few Bantu languages, have glottalized nasal clicks. These are formed by closing the glottis so that the click is pronounced in silence; however, any preceding vowel will be nasalized.

References

Nasal consonants
Click consonants
Central consonants
Voiced consonants